Thiara amarula is a species of gastropod belonging to the family Thiaridae.

Description
The length of the shell attains 32 mm.

Distribution
The species is found in Malesia, coasts of Indian and Pacific Ocean.; off Queensland, Australia

References

 Glaubrecht M., Brinkmann N. & Pöppe J. (2009). Diversity and disparity ‘down under': Systematics, biogeography and reproductive modes of the ‘marsupial' freshwater Thiaridae (Caenogastropoda, Cerithioidea) in Australia. Zoosystematics and Evolution. 85(2): 199-275
 Fischer-Piette, E. & Vukadinovic, D. (1974). Les Mollusques terrestres des Iles Comores. Mémoires du Museum National d'Histoire Naturelle, Nouvelle Série, Série A, Zoologie, 84: 1-76, 1 plate. Paris.
 Griffiths, O.L. & Florens, V.F.B. (2006). A field guide to the non-marine molluscs of the Mascarene Islands (Mauritius, Rodrigues and Réunion) and the northern dependencies of Mauritius. Bioculture Press: Mauritius. Pp. i–xv, 1–185.
 Fischer-Piette, E. & Vukadinovic, D. (1973). Sur les Mollusques Fluviatiles de Madagascar. Malacologia. 12: 339-378.

External links
 Linnaeus, C. (1758). Systema Naturae per regna tria naturae, secundum classes, ordines, genera, species, cum characteribus, differentiis, synonymis, locis. Editio decima, reformata [10th revised edition, vol. 1: 824 pp. Laurentius Salvius: Holmia]
 Lea, I.; Lea, H. C. (1851). Description of a new genus of the family Melaniana, and of many new species of the genus Melania, chiefly collected by Hugh Cuming, Esq., during his zoological voyage in the East , and now first described. Proceedings of the Zoological Society of London. 18: 179-197
 Bourguignat, J.-R. (1890). Mollusques de l'Afrique équatoriale de Moguedouchou à Bagamoyo et de Bagamoyo au Tanganika. 1-229, pls 1-8. Book dated 1889, publication date 1890
 Gould, A.A. (1847). Descriptions of the following species of Melania, from the collection of the Exploring Expedition. Proceedings of the Boston Society of Natural History. 2: 222-225
 Lamarck, (J.-B. M.) de. (1822). Histoire naturelle des animaux sans vertèbres. Tome sixième, 2me partie. Paris: published by the Author, 232 pp
 Leschke, M. (1912). Mollusken der Hamburger Südsee-Expedition 1908/1909 (Admiralitätsinseln, Bismarckarchipel, Deutsch Neuguinea). Jahrbuch der Hamburgischen Wissenschaftlichen Anstalten. 29, 2. Beiheft: 89-172
 Schepman, M. M. (1918). On a collection of land-, freshwater- and marine Mollusca from northern New Guinea. Zoologische Mededeelingen. 4(1): 1-21
 Glaubrecht M., Brinkmann N. & Pöppe J. (2009). Diversity and disparity ‘down under': Systematics, biogeography and reproductive modes of the ‘marsupial' freshwater Thiaridae (Caenogastropoda, Cerithioidea) in Australia. Zoosystematics and Evolution. 85(2): 199-275

Thiaridae